Indira Viswanathan Peterson is a literary critic and the David B. Truman Professor of Asian Studies at Mount Holyoke College. She is a specialist in South Asian Studies.

Background

Peterson was born and raised in Mumbai, India.  She came to the United States as an AFS (American Field Service) exchange high school student in the late 1960s.  She returned to Mumbai and received her B.A. in English literature from The University of Mumbai and her Ph.D. in Sanskrit from Harvard University in 1976.  She has been a professor at Mount Holyoke since 1982, with a period at Columbia University from 2002 to 2004.

Select scholarship
 Design and Rhetoric in a Sanskrit Court: The Kiratarjuniya of Bharavi, 2003
 Editor - Norton Anthology of World Literature , 2003
 Editor - Norton Anthology of World Masterpieces , 1997
 Poems to Siva: The Hymns of the Tamil Saints, 1989

See also
 List of Indian Americans

Notes

External links
 Official website
Peterson Comes Home

American women writers of Indian descent
Columbia University faculty
Mount Holyoke College faculty
Harvard University alumni
Indian emigrants to the United States
University of Mumbai alumni
American Hindus
Year of birth missing (living people)
Living people
Indian Indologists
Indian women scholars
Scholars from Mumbai
American women academics
21st-century American women